Jack Jacobus Hart (born ) is a South African rugby union player for the  in the Rugby Challenge. His regular position is scrum-half.

In 2017, he was nominated as the Lions Under 19 Backline Player of the Year.

References

External links
itsrugby.co.uk profile
ultimaterugby.com profile

South African rugby union players
Living people
1998 births
Rugby union players from Johannesburg
Rugby union scrum-halves
Golden Lions players
Falcons (rugby union) players